Höfn or Höfn í Hornafirði is an Icelandic fishing town in the southeastern part of the country. It lies near Hornafjörður fjord.

The town, the second largest in the southeastern part of Iceland, offers scenic views of Vatnajökull (the largest ice cap in Europe by volume). The community was formerly known as Hornafjarðarbær between 1994 and 1998.

Geography

Höfn is located on a peninsula in the southeast of Iceland. The name Höfn means harbour and it is a fishing port surrounded on three sides by the sea, with beaches on a long shoreline to the southeast. Shoals and glacial rivers traverse this area with many shifting lagoons and sand reefs being formed. Höfn is surrounded by several small islands to the east of the town, the largest of which is Mikley , followed by Krókalátur  and Hellir .

Nearby areas include Suðursveit  (the birthplace of Þórbergur Þórðarson), Öræfasveit, Lón , Mýrar  and Nes . In Nes there is a small village called Nesjahverfi. Sea birds such as skuas, guillemots, fulmar and puffins can be seen from the headland.

History 
Höfn was founded by the merchant Ottó Tuliníus in 1897 who relocated a trading place which had been established in 1861 from Papós, an area 15 kms northwest of Höfn, to the present site of the town. Höfn had 300 inhabitants in 1946. An economic boom started after the construction of the bridge Hornafjarðarbrú  in 1961, and with a length of 255 metres the bridge was the second largest bridge in Iceland at that time. Höfn attained municipal status on 31 December 1988 and had 1 647 inhabitants in 1989. Höfn and the community of Nesjahreppur were united on 12 July 1994 under the name Hornafjarðarbær . On 6 June 1998 Hornafjarðarbær, Bæjarhreppur , Borgarhafnarhreppur  and Hofshreppur  were united to form the new municipality of Sveitarfélagið Hornafjörður .

Economy

The main economic activities in Höfn are fishing and tourism. Fishing involves both sea fishing and processing and packaging in the factories; one major fish processing factory, Skinney-Þinganes is one of the largest fish factories in the eastern part of Iceland, which employs a large number of people. The main production of these factories is bacaloa (saltfish) and processed lobster. Herring and capelin are also processed. Ten large and a number of smaller boats operate from Höfn. During the summer tourist season, trips are organised to the nearby Vatnajökull glacier. The surrounding area has served as a filming location for feature films including  the James Bond movies Die Another Day and A View to a Kill, Lara Croft: Tomb Raider, and Batman Begins. Recently a song in the 2015 Bollywood movie "Dilwale" has been shot in the surrounding areas.

Culture
A cultural highlight of the town is the annual Humarhátíð  (a lobster festival) held on the first weekend of July. During the summer season, the Glacier Exhibition is held in the old supermarket building. Hafnarkirkja  is a modern protestant church for 200 persons which was inaugurated on 28 July 1966. Kirkja heilagrar fjölskyldu og heilags Jean-Marie Vianney is a small modern Roman Catholic church which was inaugurated on 7 September 2013.

Höfn contains several museums, including an exhibition about Vatnajökull National Park in Gamlabúð  which has a variety of displays on the geology, ecology and history of the glacier. Listasafn Svavars Guðnasonar  is a museum of art which was inaugurated in the town hall in 2011.

Gamlabúð ("Old Shop") is one of the oldest houses in Höfn still being used. It has served at least three purposes and has been moved around southeast Iceland. First it was a trade center in Papós and then it was a store in Höfn. Most recently it has been moved again and now it serves as an information center. Originally called "Krambúðin" , meaning "The Mercantile Store", in a short time it had managed to become one of the main trade centers for the people of southeast Iceland, as there were few other settlements in the area. Just about everything available in these parts of Iceland was sold here. Farmers were the main group of people making purchases, so naturally it sold mostly tools and such things that farmers needed on daily basis. In 1897 it was moved to the harbor of Höfn and stayed there for 80 years. The house was the main trade post for the citizens of Höfn from 1937-1977, but when the town began to develop and modernize, the shop had neither a place at the harbor or in the town so it changed and moved, this time to Sílavík  on the outskirts of town. The municipality decided to move it again in 2012, back to the harbour of Höfn. This was done with the blessing of The Cultural Heritage Agency of Iceland which oversees the conservation of historical buildings. It now serves as an information and visitor centre for Vatnajökull National Park.

Education
Höfn used to have three schools: Nesjaskóli, located in Nesjahverfi, Hafnarskóli and Heppuskóli. Now, the three schools have been merged into one school called Grunnskóli Hornafjarðar. In the secondary school Framhaldsskólinn í Austur-Skaftafellssýslu 70 to 100 students study in the day school and over 100 students are under distance-study programmes. The school maintains close collaboration with other schools in Iceland, the College in Egilsstaðir and the Vocational School in Neskaupstaður. The school has modern teaching facilities such as wireless internet, a computer centre, availability of laptop computers for students, overhead projectors and built-in sound systems.

Infrastructure
Höfn offers a variety of services and stores including a supermarket, pharmacy, a health centre (Heilsugaeslustöð), a bank, three hairdressers, two gas stations, a golf course and a swimming pool.
In the town there are several hotels, a camping ground, a youth hostel, guesthouses and restaurants including Pakkhúsið, Humarhöfnin, Íshúsið Pizzeria, Ottó, Kaffihornið, Ósinn, Z Bistro and Hafnarbúðin.
Various tour operators offer day trips including whale watching and flights to Vatnajökull.

Sports
The local football club is Sindri, which plays in the Icelandic 3rd tier.

Climate
Höfn has a subpolar oceanic climate (Köppen Cfc), bordering on a subarctic climate and tundra climate. On average, Höfn has 180 days with measurable precipitation. Extreme temperatures range from  recorded on August 10, 2004 to  recorded on March 8, 1969.

Transport

Höfn is well connected via Route 1, which circles Iceland. In the past, during the harsh winter months, the road just east of Höfn would often become blocked because of regular snow, hampering communications and access. To address this, a new tunnel, named Almannaskarðsgöng, was constructed and opened in 2005. The tunnel measures exactly  in length (although the sign rounds it off to 1,300).
Höfn is one of very few harbours in the southern part of Iceland and it needs to be navigated with care due to the changing pattern of shoals. Dredging is an essential requirement to remove sand that has accumulated near the harbour so that ships can safely moor. The harbour at Höfn is reported to freeze during periods of extremely cold weather.

Eagle Airways operates domestic flights from Höfn airport to Reykjavík. The town is a major centre for visitors to the Vatnajökull Glacier. Höfn lies at the end of Road 99, which leaves Iceland's National Road 1 several kilometres north of the town. A tunnel is located near the town, measuring 1,300 metres in length, which is named Almannaskarðsgöng. It was opened in 2005.

References

External links

Municipalities of Iceland
Populated places in Southern Region (Iceland)
Fishing communities in Iceland